The Honor Rumble is a periodically held battle royal promoted by the U.S.-based professional wrestling promotion Ring of Honor.

This battle royal differs from a standard version of the match in that the contestants do not all begin in the ring at the same time, but instead enter the match at timed intervals in order of their assigned entry numbers (comparable in style to WWE's Royal Rumble match). Numbers are usually drawn through a lottery that is typically staged right before the event begins, although participants can also win desirable spots via a number of other means, the most common being winning a match.

The match begins with the two wrestlers who have drawn entry numbers one and two, with the remaining wrestlers entering the ring at regular timed intervals (usually 90 seconds or two minutes) in the ascending order of their entry numbers. The winner of the Honor Rumble receives a chance to wrestle for the ROH World Championship. The first Honor Rumble took place on July 26, 2008 at ROH New Horizons.

Dates, venues, events and winners

See also
Casino Battle Royale
Royal Rumble match
Gauntlet for the Gold

References

Recurring events established in 2008
Ring of Honor
Professional wrestling battle royales